Pandaridae is a family of copepods belonging to the order Siphonostomatoida.

Genera

Genera:
 Achtheinus Wilson, 1908
 Amaterasia Izawa, 2008
 Cecrops Leach, 1816

References

Copepods